Winogradskyella echinorum is a bacterium from the genus of Winogradskyella which has been isolated from the sea urchin Strongylocentrotus intermedius.

References

Flavobacteria
Bacteria described in 2009